Swing That Cheer is a 1938 American comedy film directed by Harold D. Schuster and written by Charles Grayson and Lee Loeb. The film stars Tom Brown, Robert Wilcox, Constance Moore, Andy Devine, Samuel S. Hinds and Ernest Truex. The film was released on October 14, 1938, by Universal Pictures.

Plot
Bob and Larry are the two star player of a college team who compete to see who is the best player.

Cast        
Tom Brown as Bob Potter
Robert Wilcox as Larry Royal
Constance Moore as Marian Stuart
Andy Devine as Doc Saunders
Samuel S. Hinds as Coach McGann
Ernest Truex as Professor Peabody
Raymond Parker as Jay Hill
Margaret Early as Betty Wilson
Doodles Weaver as Bennett
Mark Daniels as Winston 
David Oliver as Intern

References

External links
 

1938 films
1930s English-language films
American comedy films
1938 comedy films
Universal Pictures films
Films directed by Harold D. Schuster
American black-and-white films
1930s American films